Namdaemun, officially known as the Sungnyemun, is one of the Eight Gates in the Fortress Wall of Seoul, South Korea, which surrounded the city in the Joseon dynasty. It is located in Jung-gu between Seoul Station and Seoul Plaza, with the historic 24-hour Namdaemun Market next to the gate.

The gate, dating back to the 14th century, is a historic pagoda-style gateway, and is designated as the first National Treasure of South Korea. It was first built in the last year of King Taejo of Joseon's reign in 1398, and rebuilt in 1447.

In 2008, the wooden pagoda atop the gate was severely damaged by arson. Restoration work on the gateway started in February 2010 and was completed on 29 April 2013. The gate was reopened on 4 May 2013.

Name
The South Korean government, as written in hanja on the wooden structure, officially calls the landmark Sungnyemun, even though it has been more commonly known as Namdaemun since the Joseon dynasty. A common belief in Korea is that the name "Namdaemun" was imposed forcibly under the Japanese Empire (colonial period), and therefore should not be used. However, Joseon dynasty annals indicate that naming the eight gates of Seoul after their respective directions was common colloquial usage before the Japanese arrived.

Different from the other gates, Sungnyemun's tablet has its name written vertically. When the first king of the Joseon dynasty, Yi Seonggye (who reigned from 1335 to 1408), constructed the capital city, he believed that fire would reach to Gyeongbokgung Palace, as well as to the capital city, as Mt. Gwanaksan of Seoul is shaped like fire according to feng shui principles. Sungnyemun's name means "fire", which is from the harmony of the Five Elements and, if written vertically, the Chinese character "fire" looks as if it is providing protection. This was Taejong's (1367–1422) first son, Yangnyeongdaegun's (1394-1462), famous writing.

History

Before the 2008 fire
Before the 2008 fire, Namdaemun was the oldest wooden structure in Seoul. The city gate, made of wood and stone with a two-tiered, pagoda-shaped tiled roof, was completed in 1398 and originally used to greet foreign emissaries, control access to the capital city, and keep out Siberian tigers, which have long been gone from the area. Construction began in 1395 during the fourth year of the reign of King Taejo of Joseon and was finished in 1398. The structure was rebuilt in 1447, during the 29th year of King Sejong the Great's reign, and has been renovated several times since. It was originally one of three main gates, the others being the East Gate (Dongdaemun) and the now-demolished West Gate in the Seodaemun-gu district, named after the old gate.

In the early part of the 20th century, the city walls that surrounded Seoul were demolished to make the traffic system more efficient. A visit to Seoul by the Crown Prince of Japan prompted the demolition of the walls around Namdaemun, as the prince was deemed to be too exalted to pass through the gateway. The gate was closed to the public in 1907 after the authority constructed an electric tramway nearby. In 1938, Namdaemun was designated as Korean Treasure No. 1 by the Governor-General of Korea.

Namdaemun was extensively damaged during the Korean War and was given its last major repair in 1961, with a completion ceremony held on 14 May 1963. It was given the status of "National Treasure No. 1" on 20 December 1962.

The gate was renovated again in 2005 with the building of a lawn around the gate, before being opened once again to the public with much fanfare on 3 March 2006. During the restoration, 182 pages of blueprints for the gate were made as a contingency against any emergencies which may damage the structure. Three years later, such an emergency arose.

2008 fire

At approximately 8:50 p.m. on 10 February 2008, a fire broke out and severely damaged the wooden structure at the top of the Namdaemun gate. The fire roared out of control again after midnight and finally destroyed the structure, despite the efforts of more than 360 firefighters. Many witnesses reported seeing a suspicious man shortly before the fire, and two disposable lighters were found where the fire was believed to have started. A 69-year-old man identified as Chae Jong-gi was arrested on suspicion of arson and later confessed to the crime. A police captain reported that Chae had sprayed paint thinner on the floor of the structure and then set fire to it. Police say that Chae was upset about not being paid in full for land he had sold to developers. The same man had been charged with setting a fire at Changgyeong Palace in Seoul in 2006.

Restoration
The Cultural Heritage Administration of South Korea said that it would undertake a three-year project that would cost an estimated ₩20 billion (approximately $14 million) to rebuild and restore the historic gate, making it the most expensive restoration project in South Korea. President Lee Myung-bak proposed starting a private donation campaign to finance the restoration of the structure.

By January 2010, 70% of the pavilion gate, the first floor and 80% of the fortress wall had been completed. Work on the roof began in April after the completion of the wooden second floor, with 22,000 roof tiles produced in a traditional kiln in Buyeo, South Chungcheong Province. The wall and basic frame were scheduled to be finished in April and May respectively. The pillars and rafters are to be elaborately decorated, with the ornamental patterns and colors based on those used in the large-scale repair in 1963, which was closest to the early-Chosun original.

In January 2013, it was estimated by an official that restoration of the gate would be completed around May 2013. Construction had been delayed by four months due to harsh weather conditions in Seoul. On 17 February 2013, the gate was 96% completed, and all steel-frame scaffolding had been removed. On 29 April 2013, restoration work was completed, and the public opening was scheduled for 4 May 2013, a day before Children's Day. It was officially reopened on 5 May 2013, after a five-year restoration period.

Only six months after the restoration was completed, paint started to chip off and wood cracked. President Park Geun-hye ordered an investigation into the matter.

Image gallery

See also

Fortress Wall of Seoul
Namdaemun Market
Shinhan Bank
Namdaemun Battle
Deoksugung

References

External links

Buildings and structures completed in 1398
Buildings and structures in Jung District, Seoul
National Treasures of South Korea
Gates in South Korea
Tourist attractions in Seoul
History of Seoul
Buildings and structures destroyed by arson